Ernest William Castine (26 November 1869 – 8 February 1955) was a pastoralist and politician in the State of South Australia.

History
Castine was born at "Prospect Cottage", Auburn, the son of Colonel John William Castine (member for Wooroora from 1884 to 1902) and Nannie Castine (née Barkla). He was educated at Riverton Public School and Prince Alfred College. For a time he ran a store in Auburn, then a  property "Penobscot" at Watervale and an  grazing property near Quorn. He was also managing director of Andamooka Pastoral Company running  and was partner with Sidney Kidman in Morney Plains Station in Queensland.

Politics
He was chairman of the Upper Wakefield District Council in 1932. He was selected by the Liberal and Country League to contest the 1933 Legislative Council election for the Midland district in 1933. He was successful and held the seat unopposed until 1947, when he was dis-endorsed by his Party in favor of D. P. Gordon. He nevertheless stood as an Independent, but was defeated at the polls.

Other interests
He was secretary of the Northern Agricultural Society, a member of the board of the Clare and District Hospital. He played cricket, golf and bowls, and was president of the Watervale Golf Club, and an active member of the Clare Bowling Club.

Family
On 22 April 1891 he married Selma Sobels (28 April 1902 – 28 June 1922) of "Springvale", Watervale.
They lived at "Penobscot" Watervale. He married again, to Miss Serena Amanda Castine Warren (his first cousin) around September 1923 in Rawmarsh, Yorkshire, England.

References 

Members of the South Australian Legislative Council
Australian pastoralists
1869 births
1955 deaths
Liberal and Country League politicians
People from Auburn, South Australia